The year 702 BC was a year of the pre-Julian Roman calendar. In the Roman Empire, it was known as year 52 Ab urbe condita . The denomination 702 BC for this year has been used since the early medieval period, when the Anno Domini calendar era became the prevalent method in Europe for naming years.

Events
 King of Rome Numa Pompilius.

Births

Deaths
 Merodach Baladan, Babylonian ruler
 Shabaka, Kushite pharaoh of the Twenty-fifth Dynasty of Egypt

References

700s BC